USNS Sacagawea (T-AKE-2), a Lewis and Clark-class dry cargo ship, is the third ship operated by the United States Navy to be named for Sacagawea, the Shoshone woman who acted as guide and interpreter for the Lewis and Clark Expedition, and one of the few United States Navy ships named for women.

The contract to build her was awarded to National Steel and Shipbuilding Company (NASSCO) of San Diego, California, on 18 October 2001. Construction began in September 2004 for a scheduled delivery in early 2007.

She was launched in June 2006. Two of Sacagawea's descendants, Lucy Diaz and Rachel Ariwite, were the ship's sponsors.  USNS Sacagawea is one of 14 Lewis and Clark-class ships and is part of the 14 ships that comprise the United States Marine Corps Maritime Prepositioning Program.

In January 2013, USNS Sacagawea was transferred to the Maritime Prepositioning Squadron Three (MPSRON-3) in Saipan. Within days of her arrival, she participated in Exercise Freedom Banner in the Republic of the Philippines.  Freedom Banner is the only annually funded Maritime Prepositioning Force exercise in the Marine Corps and continues to be a proving ground for concept validation.

During Freedom Banner 13, the Marine Air Ground Task Force (MAGTF) used both vertical connectors in the form of MV-22 Osprey aircraft, and surface connectors in the form of landing craft, utility (LCU), and landing craft, mechanized, “Mike 8” (LCM-8) boats loaded aboard USNS 1st Lt. Jack Lummus. These dedicated ship-to-shore connectors not only enabled the standup of the MAGTF, but also provided sustainment to exercise forces ashore during the conduct of the exercise.

This vessel is the only USNS Sacagawea. However, other U.S. Navy vessels have been named  .

References 
Based on data from the Naval Vessel Register and press releases.

Notes

External links 

  Official website of USNS Sacagawea
 
  msc.navy.mil: USNS Sacagawea
  navsource.org: USNS Sacagawea
  navysite.de: USNS Sacagawea

 

USNS Sacagawea(T-AKE-2)
Lewis and Clark-class dry cargo ships
Bulk carriers of the United States Navy
2006 ships